Mamut may refer to:

 Mamutica, the largest building (by volume) in Zagreb and Croatia, as well as one of the largest apartment blocks in Europe
 Alexander Mamut (born 1960), Russian businessman
 Khalil Mamut, Uygur refugee and ex-inmate of Guantanamo Bay